Graeme Thomas Brewer (born 1 December 1958) is an Australian former freestyle swimmer of the late 1970s and early 1980s who won a bronze medal in the 200-metre freestyle at the 1980 Summer Olympics.  In all he won 13 Australian titles.

A native of New South Wales, Brewer attended Sydney Boys High School, graduating in 1976. He first gained attention in the surf lifesaving world when he won consecutive Australian junior ironman championships in 1976 and 1977, competing for the Tamarama club from Sydney's eastern suburbs. Switching to competition in the pool, Brewer gained prominence at Canada's 1978 Commonwealth Games in Edmonton, winning a silver medal in the 200-metre freestyle and one of each colour in the three relays.

In Moscow, Brewer claimed a bronze medal behind the Soviet Union pair of Sergey Kopliakov and Andrei Krylov. He came eighth in the 100-metre freestyle and seventh in the 4x200-metre freestyle relay along with Mark Tonelli, Mark Kerry and Neil Brooks. He narrowly missed the final of the 400-metre freestyle.

Brewer was best known for being a member of the so-called "Mean Machine" competing at the 1982 Commonwealth Games in Brisbane, when he combined with Neil Brooks, Greg Fasala and Michael Delany to claim gold in the 4x100-metre freestyle relay, gaining their nickname after collectively shaving their heads for the race. He also won a gold in the 4x200-metre freestyle relay. He competed at the 1984 Summer Olympics in the 4x200-metre freestyle relay, coming fourth.

See also
 List of Commonwealth Games medallists in swimming (men)
 List of Olympic medalists in swimming (men)

References

1958 births
Living people
Olympic swimmers of Australia
Australian male freestyle swimmers
Swimmers from Sydney
Swimmers at the 1980 Summer Olympics
Swimmers at the 1984 Summer Olympics
Olympic bronze medalists for Australia
Olympic bronze medalists in swimming
Medalists at the 1980 Summer Olympics
Swimmers at the 1978 Commonwealth Games
Swimmers at the 1982 Commonwealth Games
Commonwealth Games gold medallists for Australia
Commonwealth Games silver medallists for Australia
Commonwealth Games bronze medallists for Australia
Commonwealth Games medallists in swimming
Universiade medalists in swimming
Universiade bronze medalists for Australia
Medalists at the 1979 Summer Universiade
Medalists at the 1981 Summer Universiade
Sportsmen from New South Wales
20th-century Australian people
Medallists at the 1978 Commonwealth Games
Medallists at the 1982 Commonwealth Games